Maurício Alves Peruchi or simply Maurício (2 January 1990 – 12 April 2014), was a Brazilian football striker. He started his career in Fluminense FC and last played for US Boulogne in Championnat National.

He was signed by Villarreal CF from Fluminense FC for €700,000.

Death 
Alves Peruchi was killed on 12 April 2014 in a traffic collision at the age of 24, where his friend and teammate Alexis Sauvage was the driver.

References

External links
 
 Profile at Globo Esporte's Futpedia

1990 births
2014 deaths
Brazilian footballers
Brazilian expatriate footballers
Association football forwards
Fluminense FC players
Avaí FC players
Expatriate footballers in Spain
Expatriate footballers in France
Villarreal CF C players
Villarreal CF B players
US Boulogne players
Sportspeople from Espírito Santo
Road incident deaths in France
Brazilian expatriate sportspeople in France
Brazilian expatriate sportspeople in Spain